Wieger Martin Frisco Sietsma (born 11 July 1995) is a Dutch former professional footballer who played as a goalkeeper for Hoàng Anh Gia Lai, Milton Keynes Dons, FC Emmen and SC Heerenveen.

Club career

FC Emmen
He made his professional debut in the Eerste Divisie for FC Emmen on 9 September 2016 in a game against Helmond Sport.

Milton Keynes Dons
On 7 July 2017, Sietsma joined League One club Milton Keynes Dons on a free transfer, signing a two-year deal with an option of a further year.

Following injury to first choice goalkeeper Lee Nicholls, Sietsma made his league debut for the club on 14 April 2018 in a 1–2 home defeat to Doncaster Rovers. After becoming third choice goalkeeper following the signing of Stuart Moore, Sietsma left the club by mutual consent on 3 January 2019. In total he made 10 appearances in all competitions for the club.

Hoàng Anh Gia Lai
On 16 January 2019, Sietsma joined V.League 1 club Hoàng Anh Gia Lai on a free transfer. In September 2020, he retired from professional football.

Career statistics

References

External links

1995 births
Living people
Footballers from Groningen (city)
Dutch footballers
FC Emmen players
Eerste Divisie players
Milton Keynes Dons F.C. players
English Football League players
Dutch expatriate footballers
Expatriate footballers in England
Association football goalkeepers
Dutch expatriate sportspeople in Vietnam
Dutch expatriate sportspeople in England
Expatriate footballers in Vietnam
SC Heerenveen players
Hoang Anh Gia Lai FC players
Netherlands youth international footballers